"Two Teardrops" is a song co-written and recorded by American country music artist Steve Wariner.  It was released in February 1999 as the first single and title track from the album Two Teardrops.  The song reached #2 on the Billboard Hot Country Singles & Tracks chart, as well as hitting #30 on the Billboard Hot 100, marking Wariner's only pop top-40 hit.

Background
Wariner told Billboard in 1999 that he did not write the song until the album was near completion. He said that co-writer Bill Anderson suggested the opening line of "two teardrops floating down the river."

Chart performance

Year-end charts

References

1999 singles
1999 songs
Steve Wariner songs
Songs written by Steve Wariner
Songs written by Bill Anderson (singer)
Capitol Records Nashville singles